Crutchfield Corporation is a North American retailer specializing in a wide range of electronics, including mobile audio and video equipment for the automobile, along with speakers, televisions, and other electronics for home or portable use, serving both the United States and Canada. It was created in 1974 by William G. " Bill" Crutchfield, Jr., founder and CEO. It is based in Charlottesville, Virginia.

History
The company was created by Bill Crutchfield while he was in the process of restoring classic sports cars. While trying to upgrade the car stereo in a Porsche 356 coupe he was preparing to sell, he was unable to find anyone willing or able to perform the work. This made him realize that there was an opportunity to offer car stereos to others interested in this type of DIY project.

Company 
Crutchfield reports on its website that it has over 500 employees. It is privately held by CEO Bill Crutchfield. The Charlottesville facilities include a headquarters, a main distribution center, and a secondary distribution and processing center. In addition, Crutchfield has a satellite facility in Norton, Virginia.

Crutchfield has retail storefronts in Charlottesville and Harrisonburg, Virginia.

Crutchfield has had a web presence since 1995. Their website's Outfit My Car tool makes use of in-house measurements of thousands of vehicles to verify fit for aftermarket speakers and car stereos. The website also features articles, videos, and reviews.

Business model 

A key mission of the Crutchfield business early on was providing customers with information about audio gear and installation. 

As Crutchfield grew, it developed formal departments dedicated to Vehicle Research and Product Research. The company claims to have assembled the largest database of vehicle fit information. 

As of November 2017, they had vehicle fit information on over 25,000 vehicles. This information drives internal resources to support sales and tech support, and is also the basis of the database powering the online Outfit My Car tool. 

The Vehicle Research department also provides the information needed for Crutchfield to produce MasterSheets, which are instruction sheets for installing car stereo products in specific vehicles.

The Product Research arm of Crutchfield verifies the data provided by manufacturers on each consumer electronics product, for car and for home or portable use, in addition to performing additional tests and measurements itself.

Awards and recognition
In 2007, Bill Crutchfield was inducted into the Consumer Electronics Association Hall of Fame alongside Paul Allen and Amar Bose. The company's website, Crutchfield.com, was the first vendor-authorized audio/video retailer on the Internet.  

As of April 2018, Crutchfield was the only internet retailer to have won BizRate Insight's Platinum Circle of Excellence Award eighteen years in a row.  

Crutchfield's call center has been certified by J. D. Power and Associates' Call Center Certification Program for "meeting key expectations" and "outstanding customer service experience."

References

External links
 
 Crutchfield Official Canadian website

Consumer electronics retailers in the United States
Retail companies established in 1974
Companies based in Virginia
Online retailers of the United States
Mail-order retailers